Mark Damon (born April 22, 1933) is an American film actor and producer. He became noted for roles in films like Roger Corman's House of Usher, before moving to Italy and becoming a notable Western star and member of the 1960s Dolce Vita set of actors and actresses in Rome. After starring in over 50 films in the United States and Europe, he quit acting and reinvented himself as a film producer and pioneer of the foreign sales business in the 1970s, and became one of Hollywood's most prolific producers.

Early life
Mark Damon was born Alan Harris in Chicago, the son of a grocer. His family was Jewish, and their surname had originally been "Herscovitz". Damon moved to Los Angeles at a young age where he attended Fairfax High School.

As a senior in high school, he was scouted as an actor by Groucho Marx, but chose to attend dental school at UCLA. He soon switched to the Anderson School of Management, eventually graduating with an MBA and a BA in English. Damon also began taking theater classes, and decided that he wanted a career as an actor.

Career

Actor
In 1956, Damon started his career in Hollywood. He signed a contract with 20th Century Fox and their Regal Pictures affiliate appearing in such films as Between Heaven and Hell (1956) and This Rebel Breed (1957).

In 1960, Damon starred opposite Vincent Price in the first of Roger Corman's famous series of Edgar Allan Poe adaptations, House of Usher, written by Richard Matheson. He won a Golden Globe Award as a "Star of Tomorrow" for his performance in the film.

After an invitation from renowned director Luchino Visconti, he relocated to Rome, Italy, where he starred in over 40 films, including many classic spaghetti westerns like Johnny Oro and Johnny Yuma (1966). He was considered for the role of Django (1966) and a role done by Tomas Milian in Boccaccio '70 (1962).

Producer
Damon eventually gave up acting in the mid-1970s to become a film producer. He first entered the world of independent sales and production in the 1970s while living and working in Italy where he saw a huge market of independent international distributors eager for top American movies.

When he returned to the U.S. in 1977 he founded Producers Sales Organization (PSO). His goal was to sell important American pictures to international distributors, the first such company to compete with the major studios. Damon's subsequent success with PSO led to his reputation as the inventor of the foreign sales business and the brains behind independent film production.

His early visionary contributions to the international distribution of independently produced films are widely recognized and he has developed a reputation in the entertainment industry as not only one of the leading producers and distributors of independent films,  but as the "legendary Mark Damon" for his contribution to independent film finance structures by developing the industry-standard practice of pre-selling foreign rights and banking the distribution contracts. After PSO shut down, he was proposed to eye international productions, then he started Vision p.d.g. International, or Vision Productions (formerly Vision Producers and Distribution Group), with Peter Guber and Jon Peters, founders of The Guber-Peters Company, and it would arrange financing and worldwide distribution for some 6-8 films that were internationally, as well as some product for TV.

Later that year, in 1987, Vision International decided to grow into Vision p.d.g. and its foreign sales arm Vision International that budgeted in the $5 million range to have nine films for a total of $71 million. Vision International then formed a pact with Epic Productions, where they assumed international responsibilities for the studio.

In 1993 (after a period of legal battling with Credit Lyonnais over the company's control of Epic), he started MDP Worldwide (aka Mark Damon Productions), for short, which in 1998, was sold to Behaviour Communications, a Canadian company, which renamed to Behaviour Worldwide, before selling it back in 2000, reverting to MDP Worldwide. On June 23, 1999, Behaiviour announced that its Worldwide division would cut more than 10 jobs. In 2003, MDP Worldwide was then renamed to Media 8 Entertainment, in order to expand their own theatrical activity and their products, to change focus. He then subsequently resigned on October 14, 2004.

Damon's productions have grossed over $2 billion in theatrical box office worldwide.   Damon has been directly involved in the international licensing of over 300 feature length pictures, including such noteworthy box-office titles as the James Bond film Never Say Never Again, directed by Irvin Kershner and starring Sean Connery, Prizzi's Honor, directed by John Huston and featuring Jack Nicholson and Anjelica Huston, Once Upon A Time In America, directed by Sergio Leone and featuring Robert De Niro and James Woods, The Cotton Club, directed by Francis Ford Coppola and featuring Richard Gere and The Final Countdown, starring Kirk Douglas.

Damon has produced or executive produced over 70 films, and his films have received 10 Oscar nominations including: the 2005 Academy Award winner Monster, starring Charlize Theron; the critically acclaimed, multi-Oscar nominated World War II drama Das Boot, directed by Wolfgang Petersen; and The NeverEnding Story, also directed by Wolfgang Petersen. Other acclaimed films include The Upside of Anger, starring Oscar nominee Joan Allen and Kevin Costner; 9½ Weeks, directed by Adrian Lyne; 8 Million Ways to Die, directed by Hal Ashby; Short Circuit, directed by John Badham; High Spirits directed by Neil Jordan; The Choirboys directed by Robert Aldrich; The Lost Boys, directed by Joel Schumacher; The Jungle Book, directed by Stephen Sommers; The Musketeer directed by Peter Hyams and Beyond A Reasonable Doubt, also directed by Peter Hyams, and starring Michael Douglas. Damon was a founding member of the American Film Marketing Association (now IFTA) and is a recurring board member of the IFTA.

In 2005, Damon founded film production, financing, and sales company Foresight Unlimited. Foresight handled international sales for, co-financed, and produced the Rob Reiner comedy And So It Goes, starring Michael Douglas and Diane Keaton. The company served as executive producer on Universal Studios' 2 Guns, starring Mark Wahlberg and Denzel Washington, and Universal's Lone Survivor, directed by Peter Berg and starring Mark Wahlberg. It was sold to Chicken Soup for the Soul Entertainment in 2019. On April 30, 2019, his company DCR Finance Group launched a $100 million film fund in order to invest money for their own film organization and served as managing partner for the company.

Personal life
Damon lives with his wife Maggie ( Margaret Mary Markov) in Beverly Hills, California. They have two children.

Filmography

References

External links
 
 
 Foresight Unlimited
 From Cowboy to Mogul to Monster: The Neverending Story of Film Pioneer Mark Damon

1933 births
Living people
American expatriates in Italy
American male film actors
Film producers from Illinois
Male actors from Chicago
Male Spaghetti Western actors
New Star of the Year (Actor) Golden Globe winners